San Juan River may refer to:

North America

United States
 San Juan Creek, also called the San Juan River, located in Orange County, California
 San Juan Creek (Estrella River tributary) in San Luis Obispo County, California
 San Juan River (Colorado River tributary) in Utah, Colorado, and New Mexico in the United States, a tributary of the Colorado River

Mexico
 San Juan River (Tamaulipas) in Mexico,  states of Nuevo León and Tamaulipas
 San Juan River (Veracruz) in Mexico, state of Veracruz

Other places
 San Juan River (Guatemala), a tributary of the Pasión River
 San Juan River (Nicaragua), flows from Lake Nicaragua to the Caribbean Sea
 San Juan River (Vancouver Island), in British Columbia, Canada
 San Juan River (Dominican Republic)

South America
 San Juan River (Argentina)
 San Juan River (Chile)
 San Juan River (Colombia)
 San Juan River (Uruguay)
 San Juan River (Venezuela)

Asia
 San Juan River (Metro Manila) in the Philippines, a tributary of the Pasig River
 San Juan River (Calamba) in the Philippines, a tributary of Laguna de Bay

See also
 San Juan River Bridge, Manila, Philippines
 San Juan (disambiguation)